Urbani is a surname. Notable people with the surname include:

Amancay Urbani (born 1991), Argentine footballer
Carlo Urbani (1956–2003), Italian doctor
Dino Urbani (1882–1958), Italian fencer
Ellen Urbani (born 1969), American author
Giovanni Urbani (1900–1969), Italian Cardinal of the Roman Catholic Church
Giovanni Battista Urbani (1923–2018), Italian communist politician
Giuliano Urbani (born 1937), Italian academic and politician
Luca Urbani (born 1957), Italien ASI astronaut
Massimo Urbani (1957–1993), Italian jazz alto saxophonist
Riccardo Urbani (born 1958), Italian swimmer
Samantha Urbani (born 1987), American singer, songwriter, visual artist, filmmaker and producer from Mystic, Connecticut
Tom Urbani (1968–2022), American baseball player
Valentino Urbani (1690–1722), Italian opera singer and actor
Vincent Urbani (born 1985), Italian photographer

See also
Liber Urbani, first English courtesy book
Steriphoma urbani, a species of plant in the family Capparaceae
Urbani izziv, English-language journal

References